Poland competed at the 2016 Summer Paralympics in Rio de Janeiro, Brazil, from 7 to 18 September 2016.

Medalists

Disability classifications

Every participant at the Paralympics has their disability grouped into one of five disability categories; amputation, the condition may be congenital or sustained through injury or illness; cerebral palsy; wheelchair athletes, there is often overlap between this and other categories; visual impairment, including blindness; Les autres, any physical disability that does not fall strictly under one of the other categories, for example dwarfism or multiple sclerosis. Each Paralympic sport then has its own classifications, dependent upon the specific physical demands of competition. Events are given a code, made of numbers and letters, describing the type of event and classification of the athletes competing. Some sports, such as athletics, divide athletes by both the category and severity of their disabilities, other sports, for example swimming, group competitors from different categories together, the only separation being based on the severity of the disability.

Archery

Poland qualified two archers for the Rio Games following their performance at the 2015 World Archery Para Championships, both in the recurve open with one spot for a man and one for a woman. Milena Olszewska earned the first spot.  She came into the competition as the 2014 European Para Archery Championship the silver medallist. Piotr Sawicki earned Poland's second spot after defeating Japan’s Takahiro Hasegawa.

Men

Women

Mixed

Athletics

Men
Track

Field

Women

Track

Field

Cycling 

With one pathway for qualification being one highest ranked NPCs on the UCI Para-Cycling male and female Nations Ranking Lists on 31 December 2014, Poland qualified for the 2016 Summer Paralympics in Rio, assuming they continued to meet all other eligibility requirements.

Road

Men

Women

Track

Pursuits and time trials

Men

Women

Equestrian 
The country earned an individual slot via the Para Equestrian Individual Ranking List Allocation method.

Individual

Paracanoeing

Poland earned a qualifying spot at the 2016 Summer Paralympics in this sport following their performance at the 2015 ICF Canoe Sprint & Paracanoe World Championships in Milan, Italy where the top six finishers in each Paralympic event earned a qualifying spot for their nation. Jakub Tokarz earned the spot for Poland after finishing second in the men's KL1 event. Mateusz Surwilo earned a second spot for Poland after finishing seventh in the men's KL3 event.  He qualified because a country only gets one canoe per event, and Russia had two canoes ahead of them.

Powerlifting

Men

Women

Rowing

One pathway for qualifying for Rio involved having a boat have top eight finish at the 2015 FISA World Rowing Championships in a medal event.  France qualified for the 2016 Games under this criteria in the TA Mixed Double Sculls event with a seventh-place finish in a time of 04:08.770.

Qualification Legend: FA=Final A (medal); FB=Final B (non-medal); R=Repechage

Sailing

One pathway for qualifying for Rio involved having a boat have top seven finish at the 2015 Combined World Championships in a medal event where the country had nor already qualified through via the 2014 IFDS Sailing World Championships.  Poland qualified for the 2016 Games under this criteria in the SKUD 18 event with a fifth-place finish overall and the second country who had not qualified via the 2014 Championships.  The boat was crewed by Monika Gibes and Piotr Cichocki.

Shooting

Swimming

Men

Women

Table tennis

Men

Men's team

Women

Women's team

Wheelchair fencing

Men

Women

Wheelchair tennis 
Poland qualified two competitor in the men's single event, Kamil Fabisiak and Tadeusz Kruszelnicki.

See also
Poland at the 2016 Summer Olympics

References

Nations at the 2016 Summer Paralympics
2016
2016 in Polish sport